Viliam Geffert (born 1955) is a Slovak
theoretical computer scientist
known for his contributions
to the computational complexity theory in sublogarithmic space
and to the state complexity of two-way finite automata.
He has also developed new in-place sorting algorithms.
He is a professor and the head of the computer science department at the P. J. Šafárik University in Košice.

Biography
Geffert did his undergraduate studies at the P. J. Šafárik University, graduating in 1979. He earned his PhD degree in 1988 from the Comenius University in Bratislava. Since 2003, he is a full professor of the P. J. Šafárik University.

References

External links
 

Slovak computer scientists
Theoretical computer scientists
1955 births
People from Košice
Comenius University alumni
Living people